Nar Nar Goon North is a bounded rural locality in Victoria, Australia,  south-east of Melbourne's Central Business District, located within the Shire of Cardinia local government area. Nar Nar Goon North recorded a population of 819 at the 2021 census.

History

Nar Nar Goon North Post Office opened on 1 January 1917 and closed in 1971.

Sport and leisure
Nar Nar Goon North features horse riding tracks through the bush land of the Bunyip State Park. Horse riding lessons are also available from local trainers.

See also
 Shire of Pakenham – Nar Nar Goon North was previously within this former local government area.

References

Shire of Cardinia